You're Welcome! is a double-album by Electric Six with disc one being the band's fifteenth studio album, composed entirely of cover songs (a sequel to their previous covers album Mimicry), and disc two consisting of the live performance given by the band at the Oxford O2 Academy on 22 April 2017. It was funded through a Kickstarter campaign and self-released directly to the campaign's backers.

Production 
The band launched a Kickstarter campaign to raise $30,000 in order to fund the album. It was successful with a total of $77,000 being raised.

One specific pledge reward as part of the Kickstarter campaign was to choose a song to be covered on the album. The four songs chosen by fans through this method were "Young Americans" by David Bowie, "Vow" by Garbage, "Nightclubbing" by Iggy Pop, "Magic Dance" by David Bowie, "Rasputin" by Boney M., "Seminole Bingo" by Warren Zevon and "Last Night I Had a Dream" by Randy Newman.

As stretch goals, the project's backers were given the option to vote for songs to be included in the live set recorded for the second half of the album. The songs selected by this method were "Dance Pattern", "I Invented the Night" and "Randy's Hot Tonight". As additional stretch goals, funds were secured to produce music videos for songs from the band's previous album, Fresh Blood for Tired Vampyres. These were "I'll Be In Touch" and "I Got the Box".

By coincidence, the final album contained two covers of songs by Bowie, with a further cover of a song co-written by Bowie. The band previously covered Bowie's "Cat People (Putting Out Fire)" on their first cover album, Mimicry and Memories, and had also covered "Blue Jean" on the tribute album A Salute to the Thin White Duke: The Songs of David Bowie.

Track listing

Personnel
 Dick Valentine - vocals
 Tait Nucleus? - synthesizer
  - guitar
 Da Ve - guitar
 Rob Lower - bass
 Todd Glass - drums (tracks 5, 7-10)
 Ray Kubian - drums (Live in Oxford)
 Nickey Winkelman - background vocals (tracks 2, 7)
 Scott Weinert - bass (track 3)
 Daniel Ohlson - trumpet (track 3), background vocals (track 7)
 Mel Caceres - background vocals (tracks 6, 23)
 Sabina Alteras-Honig - drums (track 6)
 Matt Tompkins - drums (track 6)
 Benton Redmann - background vocals (track 10)
 Benjamin Hurd - bass (track 10)

References 

Electric Six albums
2017 albums